Tony Darden (born August 11, 1975) is a former American football defensive back who played National Football League. He played college football at Texas Tech.

Early life and high school
Darden was born in Baton Rouge, Louisiana and grew up in San Antonio, Texas, where he attended Oliver Wendell Holmes High School. As a senior he passed for 3,236 yards and 45 touchdowns.

College career
Darden was a member of the Texas Tech Red Raiders for five seasons, redshirting as a true freshman. He began his redshirt freshman season as a quarterback, starting the first three games of the season and splitting duties with Zebbie Lethridge before moving to wide receiver after five games. Darden changed positions again to cornerback before his junior season. As a senior, he recorded 32 tackles with four passes broken up and two interceptions and was named second team 1997 All-Big 12 Conference.

Professional career
Darden was selected in the seventh round of the 1998 NFL Draft by the Minnesota Vikings. He spent his rookie season on injured reserve and was cut at the end of training camp in 1999. Darden was signed by the San Diego Chargers on January 18, 2000. Darden was waived during the 2001 offseason and claimed by the Green Bay Packers, who cut him during training camp.

References

1975 births
American football defensive backs
Texas Tech Red Raiders football players
Players of American football from San Antonio
San Diego Chargers players
Minnesota Vikings players
Green Bay Packers players
American football quarterbacks
American football wide receivers
Living people